The 1998–99 Minnesota Golden Gophers men's basketball team represented the University of Minnesota during the 1998–99 NCAA Division I men's basketball season. Led by 13th-year head coach Clem Haskins, the Golden Gophers advanced to the NCAA tournament and finished with a 17–11 record (8–8 Big Ten).

Roster

Schedule and results

|-
!colspan=9 style=| Non-conference regular season

|-
!colspan=9 style=| Big Ten regular season

|-
!colspan=9 style=| Big Ten Tournament

|-
!colspan=9 style=| NCAA Tournament

Rankings

References

Minnesota Golden Gophers men's basketball seasons
Minnesota
Minnesota
1998 in sports in Minnesota
1999 in sports in Minnesota